Geraldine Anne Kenney-Wallace (born March 29, 1943)  is a British-Canadian academic. She served as the president and vice-chancellor of McMaster University from 1990 to 1995. She was educated in England and later earned her Ph.D. from the University of British Columbia. Kenney-Wallace was responsible for organizing the first ultrafast laser lab in Canada, in 1974, at the University of Toronto. She was a professor of chemistry and physics at the University of Toronto and had served as Chairman of the Science Council of Canada. She is a recipient of a E.W.R. Steacie Memorial Fellowship (1984), Guggenheim Fellowship (1983), and Killam Senior Research Fellowship (1979).

References

Living people
1943 births
Academic staff of the University of Toronto
20th-century Canadian physicists
21st-century Canadian physicists
20th-century Canadian women scientists
Canadian women physicists
Scientists from London
University of British Columbia alumni